"In No Time at All" is a song written by Richard Leigh and Archie Jordan, and recorded by American country music artist Ronnie Milsap.  It was released in August 1979 as the second single from his album Images. The song reached number 6 on the Billboard Hot Country Singles chart.

Chart performance

"Get It Up"
The flip side to "In No Time At All" was "Get It Up." Styled as a disco song, the song was a "tag-along" flip on the Hot Country Singles chart, and independently reached No. 43 on the Hot 100.

Chart performance

References

1979 singles
1979 songs
Ronnie Milsap songs
Songs written by Richard Leigh (songwriter)
RCA Records singles
Songs written by Archie Jordan